"Before You Go" is a song written by Candice Alley. It was released in January 2007 as the lead single from her second studio album, Candice Alley (2007). The song peaked at number 16, becoming Alley's second top twenty single.

Track listing
Australian CD single
 "Before You Go"	
 "Before You Go" (acoustic version)	
 "Before You Go" (remix)	
 "Before You Go" (instrumental)

Charts

Weekly charts

Year-end charts

References

2006 songs
2007 singles
Candice Alley songs